The Grape Bowl was a postseason college football bowl game played in 1947 and 1948.  It was held at the Grape Bowl stadium, in Lodi, California.

Both games featured the College of the Pacific (now University of the Pacific), who defeated Utah State in 1947, and played Hardin–Simmons to a tie in 1948.  Like some other postseason match-ups of the era, such as the Glass Bowl and the Optimist Bowl, results are listed in NCAA records, but the games were not considered NCAA-sanctioned bowls.

Game results

1947: Pacific 35, Utah State 21

1948: Hardin–Simmons 35, Pacific 35

LeBaron-Celeri game
While the Grape Bowl game did not continue past 1948, a game following the 1949 season was also held at the same venue, between senior players from Pacific and Cal.  Organized to showcase quarterbacks Eddie LeBaron of Pacific and Bob Celeri of Cal, the game drew over 20,000 fans, and was also called the "Cash Bowl", as proceeds from the game were divided among players. The game was played on February 12, 1950, and resulted in a 7–6 victory for Pacific, the difference being a missed extra point.

See also
 List of college bowl games

References

Defunct college football bowls